Majikat is a CD and DVD live album by British singer-songwriter Cat Stevens. It was recorded during the US leg of Stevens' Earth Tour 1976, but was not released until 2004, by which time the artist was known as Yusuf Islam.

Track listing
All songs written by Cat Stevens, except where noted.

DVD
"The Doves" (Majikat Tour Theme)" (DVD Only)
"The Wind" 
"Moonshadow" 
"Where Do the Children Play?" 
"Another Saturday Night" (Sam Cooke) – 2:35
"Hard Headed Woman" 
"Miles From Nowhere" (DVD Only)
"King of Trees" 
"C79" 
"Lady D'Arbanville" 
"Banapple Gas" 
"Majik of Majiks" 
"Tuesday's Dead" 
"Oh Very Young" 
"The Hurt" 
"Sad Lisa" 
"Two Fine People" 
"Fill My Eyes" 
"Father and Son" 
"Ruins" (DVD Only) 
"Peace Train" 

The concert first encore, "Wild World", appears on the DVD as a bonus feature along with other archive material i.e. the three live tracks: 
"If I Laugh" from BBC 'Old Grey Whistle Test' 1971; 
"Maybe You're Right" from BBC 'In Concert' 1971; 
"Tuesday's Dead" from Granada 'Out Front' 1971.

CD
"Wild World" – 3:03
"The Wind" – 1:38
"Moonshadow" – 2:43
"Where Do the Children Play?" – 3:20
"Another Saturday Night" (Sam Cooke) – 2:35
"Hard Headed Woman" – 3:54
"King of Trees" – 3:28
"C79" – 3:08
"Lady D'Arbanville" – 3:47
"Banapple Gas" – 3:08
"Majik of Majiks" – 4:27
"Tuesday's Dead" – 4:06
"Oh Very Young" – 2:24
"How Can I Tell You" – 4:10 (CD Only)
"The Hurt" – 4:54
"Sad Lisa" – 3:26
"Two Fine People" – 3:47
"Fill My Eyes" – 3:01
"Father and Son" – 4:10
"Peace Train" – 3:58

Concert setlist
Source:
Set 1
"The Doves (Instrumental Intro)"
"The Wind"
"Moonshadow"
"Where Do the Children Play?"
"Another Saturday Night" (Sam Cooke)
"Hard Headed Woman"
"Sitting"
"Whistlestar"
"King of Trees"
"Sun/C79"
"Lady D'Arbanville"
"Banapple Gas"

Set 2
"Majik of Majiks"
"Tuesday's Dead"
"Oh Very Young"
"How Can I Tell You"
"The Hurt"
"Miles From Nowhere"
"Sad Lisa"
"Two Fine People"
"Fill My Eyes"
"Father and Son"
"Ruins"
"Peace Train"

Encore
"Wild World"
"Jzero"

Personnel
Cat Stevens – guitars, piano, vocals
Alun Davies – guitars, vocals
Mark Warner – guitars, bouzouki
Bruce Lynch – bass guitar
Jean Roussel – Hammond organ, clavinet, electric piano, synthesizer
Gerry Conway – drums, percussion
Chico Batera – percussion
Larry Steele – percussion, flute, acoustic guitar, bass guitar
Kimberley Carlson – backing vocals
Angela Howell – backing vocals
Suzanne Lynch – backing vocals

Certifications and sales

References

External links

2004 live albums
Cat Stevens live albums